Johann Rudolf Lauffer (7 November 1752 – 24 December 1833) was a Swiss-born Curaçaoan soldier, colonial administrator and businessman. He became Director of Curaçao and Dependencies after a military coup d'état on 1 December 1796 and served until 13 January 1803.

Biography
Lauffer was born on 7 November 1752 in Zofingen, Switzerland. After finishing elementary school, he wanted to travel to the United States, but ended up in Curaçao where he enlisted in the schutterij (militia) in 1776.

On 18 January 1795, William V, Prince of Orange fled from the Netherlands, and went into exile in Great-Britain shortly before the announcement of the Batavian Republic. While in exile, Willem V started writing the Kew Letters to the colonial governors urging them to submit to Great-Britain. Governor Johannes de Veer refused to submit to the Batavian Republic, and was replaced by Jan Jacob Beaujon in August 1796. On 14 August, Lauffer was elected by acclamation as the new commander of the Military Committee.

Beaujon appointed J.M. Brunnings, an orangist, as new secretary which lead to a conflict with Lauffer and the patriots (Republicans). On 20 October 1796, the French commander M. Valteau arrived on the island with a defence plan, and Lauffer had taken control of all the military forces including the corps of free blacks and mulattoes. To gain popular support, Beaujon was characterised as an orangist and pro-British and was compared to his brother Antony who had handed Demerara to the British. On 1 December, Lauffer overthrew the government with the military and French troops from Guadelope, and was installed as Director of Curaçao and Dependencies.

To prevent attacks by the British navy, Lauffer ordered the construction of Fort Republiek (now: Fort Oranje Nassau) on Curaçao and Fort Zoutman on Aruba. Even though Curaçao was aligned with France, he tried to keep troops off the islands, and focused on commercial interests.

In 1800, French troops from Guadeloupe landed on Curaçao in order to prevent a possible attack of the British. Lauffer managed to contact the Americans and British, and informed them that he was prepared to surrender the islands under the same terms as Suriname. On 21 September 1800, the Americans landed, and most of the French troops fled. On 17 October, Lauffer officially surrendered to British rule. He resigned on 23 October, however the Lord Hugh Seymour refused to accept his resignation, and persuaded him to stay on as governor.

The islands were returned to the Netherlands by the Peace of Amiens. On 13 January 1803, Lauffer was succeeded by Abraham de Veer, and was ordered to return to the Netherlands. On 12 November 1805, after a court-martial, he was acquitted and honourably discharged, and given a passport for him and his slave Johannes Theodorus.

Lauffer returned to Curaçao, and stayed out of politics for the rest of his life. In 1799, he had bought the Bleinheim plantation. He would focus on international trade, and the Amsterdam and New York Stock Exchange, and would become one of the biggest mortgage holders in Curaçao.

Lauffer died on 24 December 1833 at his estate of Bleinheim, at the age of 81.

Legacy
In August 1952, a new high school in Curaçao was named "Gouverneur Johann Rudolf Lauffer school".

References

Bibliography

1752 births
1833 deaths
Governors of the Netherlands Antilles
18th-century coups d'état and coup attempts
Military coups in Curaçao
People from Zofingen
Swiss military personnel
18th-century Dutch military personnel
Curaçao businesspeople
Plantation owners